Sequalitchew Creek, located in DuPont, Washington emanates from Sequalitchew Lake, Fort Lewis, Washington, was the location of the original Fort Nisqually trading post established in 1833 by the Hudson's Bay Company.  The historic, natural flow of Sequalitchew Creek runs from Sequalitchew Lake, through Edmonds Marsh, down the canyon and out to the Puget Sound.

History

Lands around the creek were territory of Coast Salish tribes, including the Steilacoom people, a Coast Salish tribe.

In 1832 the area that became Fort Nisqually was sited by Hudson's Bay Company's chief trader, Archibald McDonald. In cooperation with the Nisqually people, a storehouse for blankets, seeds, and potatoes was built at the mouth of Sequalitchew Creek.

1839: Nisqually Methodist Episcopal Mission was established, bringing the first U.S. citizens into the Puget Sound region near the creek canyon.
1841: Wilkes U.S. Exploring Expedition set up an observatory on the bluff near the creek to survey, map and chart the waters of Puget Sound. They joined the Americans at the mission to hold the first Fourth of July celebration west of the Mississippi River.
1843: Second Fort Nisqually. Business became mainly agricultural, and the fort was relocated on a flat-plains area near the banks of Sequalitchew Creek.
1904: First joint Army-National Guard training exercises on west coast were held. The massive encampment near Sequalitchew Creek included the “Buffalo Soldiers” of the 9th Cavalry.

In 1959 and 1960, Sequalitchew Lake was utilized by the Washington Department of Fisheries as a fish farm that reared and released coho salmon to Sequalitchew Creek. From 1976 until the mid-1990s the Washington Department of Fisheries operated a coho salmon fish hatchery and rearing facility on Sequalitchew Lake. In the past, Native Americans caught from 3,500 to 4,000 fish annually in Sequalitchew Creek.

Course

The total drainage basin of the Creek encompasses . This watershed begins at Kinsey Marsh, draining via Murray Creek into American Lake. Seasonal overflow from American Lake feeds Sequalitchew Lake. The water level of both lakes is maintained year-round by springs and water table seepage. A diversion dam, built by Fort Lewis around 1950, lies near the headwaters of the Creek. The dam drains through a canal that originates in Hamer Marsh, east of the Creek. Just south of Sequalitchew Lake, the canal passes under the Creek through a series of complicated culverts. It continues west for one mile (1.6 km), and turns north to empty into Puget Sound at Tatsolo Point, off Steilacoom-DuPont Road, DuPont.  The creek bed still carries water, in the form of ground water runoff, down the same historic creek path, finally emptying into the Puget Sound.

Creek trail and beach
The area can be traversed on an old narrow gauge railway roadbed that ran from the DuPont Company area to Puget Sound.  The trail leads to Sequalitchew beach. The creek corridor is used by hundreds of species, including eagles, hawks, song birds, herons, ducks, owls, frogs, salamanders, snakes, beaver, raccoons, coyotes, deer, and rabbits. The waters off Sequalitchew Beach are inhabited by harbor seal and gray whale.

Proposed mining expansion
If allowed, it will create a  hole in the underlying gravel as 40 million tons of gravel is extracted over the next 14 years. The flow from this exposed aquifer (estimated at approximately 6.5 million gallons per day) will be directed down a man made ditch to Sequalitchew Creek with a flow eight times that of present Sequalitchew Creek. Nearby Pond Lake, McKay Marsh, Bell Marsh and Hammer Marsh will be adversely affected.

DuPont staff recommendation

On January 16, 2009, Bill Kingman, DuPont Planning Department signed on behalf of the City of DuPont to accept the proposed mining expansion as follows, (directly quoting):

Approval of expansion of the aggregate mine into the area proposed is recommended, but with conditions that change some of the characteristics of the proposal.

This approval would include:
Expansion of aggregate removal throughout the  proposed would be allowed.
Groundwater aquifer dewatering to lower the water table for access to additional aggregate would be allowed. This initially would be accomplished through interceptor wells. In the long term, construction of a portion of the proposed new North Sequalitchew Creek channel would permanently intercept groundwater and discharge to the existing Sequalitchew Creek.
Mitigation for potential groundwater aquifer drawdown impacts on Edmond Marsh would be accomplished by replacing invasive vegetation by native vegetation that will result in equal or greater wetland function and values.
Removal of the “Kettle Wetland” would be allowed with mitigation consisting of creation of replacement wetlands that may be located adjacent to the proposed new North Sequalitchew Creek channel.
Displacement of wetland functions at the Seep and Riparian Forest wetlands adjacent to Sequalitchew Creek due to interception of groundwater from the excavation for aggregate removal would be approved with mitigation consisting of replacement wetlands.

Glacier Northwest's current Conditional Use Permit to expand the mine, and dewater the aquifer and creek violates the 1994 Settlement Agreement as established by the Nisqually Delta Association. DuPont Municipal Code specifically protects wetlands.  Although a signatory, the city of DuPont ignored the '94 agreement and their own municipal code and did not discourage Glacier from applying to expand their mining extraction.
In accordance with the '94 Agreement, parties are now meeting regularly to determine next steps.

Sequalitchew Village
 City of DuPont's 2008 Draft Comprehensive Land Use Plan, p. 47 describes future use of the mining area, Sequalitchew Creek and dewatering of the aquifer to include total build out of approximately 2,138 residences.  The proposed neighborhood would be named Sequalitchew Village.

Memorandum of Understanding
A Memorandum of Understanding has been crafted regarding the supplemental review process for Glacier NW's mining expansion at Sequalitchew Creek. The document was introduced to the council at their October 13, 2009 meeting, to be signed and approved.  Several council members expressed concern about lack of public review.  Public review and comment is currently being solicited, after which the document will then be again considered at the November 10, 2009 meeting.

Fauna 
In a 1982 Weyerhaueser environmental impact statement, the following vertebrate species were found in the creek:

Fish 

Steelhead
Chinook salmon
Coho salmon
Chum salmon
Pink salmon
Coastal cutthroat trout
Black bullhead

Birds 

Common loon
Red-throated loon
Red-necked grebe
Horned grebe
Pied-billed grebe
Double-crested cormorant
Green heron
Mallard
Gadwall
Pintail
Green-winged teal
Blue-winged teal
American wigeon
Northern shoveler
Wood duck
Ring-necked duck
Canvasback
Greater scaup
Lesser scaup
Common goldeneye
Bufflehead
White-winged scoter
Surf scoter
Black scoter
Ruddy duck
Red-breasted merganser
Turkey vulture
Sharp-shinned hawk
Cooper's hawk
Red-tailed hawk
Bald eagle
Osprey
American kestrel
Blue grouse
Ruffed grouse
California quail
Ring-necked pheasant
Virginia rail
American coot
Killdeer
Common snipe
Spotted sandpiper
Greater yellowlegs
Least sandpiper
Western sandpiper
Parasitic jaeger
Glaucous-winged gull
Herring gull
California gull
Ring-billed gull
Mew gull
Bonaparte's gull
Common tern
Common murre
Pigeon guillemot
Marbled murrelet
Cassin's auklet
Rhinoceros auklet
Band-tailed pigeon
Rock dove
Mourning dove
Barn owl
Great horned owl
Short-eared owl
Rufous hummingbird
Belted kingfisher
Northern flicker
Pileated woodpecker
Yellow-bellied sapsucker
Hairy woodpecker
Downy woodpecker
Willow flycatcher
Pacific-slope flycatcher
Western wood pewee
Olive-sided flycatcher
Violet-green swallow
Tree swallow
Northern rough-winged swallow
Barn swallow
Cliff swallow
Purple martin
Canada jay
Steller's jay
Crow
Northwestern crow
Black-capped chickadee
Chestnut-backed chickadee
Bushtit
Red-breasted nuthatch
Brown creeper
Dipper
House wren
Winter wren
Bewick's wren
Long-billed marsh wren
American robin
Varied thrush
Hermit thrush
Swainson's thrush
Townsend's solitaire
Golden-crowned kinglet
Ruby-crowned kinglet
Water pipit
Cedar waxwing
Northern shrike
Starling
Solitary vireo
Warbling vireo
Yellow warbler
Yellow-rumped warbler
MacGillivray's warbler
Common yellowthroat
Wilson's warbler
Western meadowlark
Yellow-headed blackbird
Brewer's blackbird
Red-winged blackbird
Brown-headed cowbird
Western tanager
Black-headed grosbeak
Purple finch
House finch
Pine siskin
American goldfinch
Red crossbill
Spotted towhee
Savannah sparrow
Vesper sparrow
Dark-eyed junco
White-crowned sparrow
Fox sparrow
Song sparrow

Mammals 

Masked shrew
Trowbridge's shrew
Vagrant shrew
Dusky shrew
Pacific water shrew
Shrew-mole
Townsend's mole
Pacific mole
Bat
Raccoon
Long-tailed weasel
Striped skunk
Coyote
Northern shrike harbor seal
Townsend's chipmunk
Western gray squirrel
Beaver
Deer mouse
Townsend's vole
Oregon vole
Muskrat
House mouse
Pacific jumping mouse
Porcupine
Snowshoe hare
Eastern cottontail
Black-tailed deer
Gray whale

Reptials and amphibians 

Brown cave salamander
Northern rough-skinned newt
Western redback salamander
Oregon slender salamander
Boreal toad
Pacific tree frog
Northern red-legged frog
Bullfrog
Northwestern fence lizard
Northern alligator lizard
Pacific rubber boa
Puget Sound red-sided garter snake
Wandering garter snake

Footnotes

References
City of DuPont, Washington
Glacier Northwest, Pioneer Aggregate Mine Expansion City File No’s, CUP 07-01, LU 07-01, SA 07-01
Memorandum of Understanding, Glacier NW, City of DuPont, Washington at Sequalitchew Creek.
DuPont Municipal Code, Chapter 25.105, Sensitive Areas
Nisqually Delta Association
1994 Settlement Agreement
Final Supplemental Environmental Impact Statement, Glacier NW DuPont Mining Expansion and North Sequalitchew Creek Project, May 1, 2007
Glacier Northwest Application for Conditional Use Permit Compiance Statement, November 15, 2007
A Twentieth Century History of Sequalitchew Creek
DuPont Historical Museum
City of DuPont's 2008 Draft Comprehensive Land Use Plan, p. 47
Weyerhaueser Export Facility Plan, Final Environmental Impact Statement, Volume II, U.S. Army Corps of Engineers, Seattle District, May 1982, p. 111
City of DuPont, Glacier NW Pioneer Aggregate Mine Expansion Staff Report
Sequalitchew Creek Council
Sequalitchew Creek Watershed Project, Pacific Lutheran University, Tacoma
Glacier Northwest's Sand and Gravel Mine Permit History
RCW 36.70A.060: Natural resources lands and critical areas - Development regulations.

External links
 Pioneer Aggregates Expansion and North Sequalitchew Creek Project
 Glacier Northwest Aggregate Mine Proposal
 Published Tidal Bench Mark Sheet for 9446828 DuPont Warf, Nisqually Reach, Washington
 Dewatering Plan, DuPont Mine Expansion and North Sequalitchew Creek Project Prepared for: Glacier Northwest Project No. 040001-009-01, November 15, 2007

Rivers of Washington (state)
History of Washington (state)
Washington Territory
Rivers of Pierce County, Washington